The Rugby league transfer record is the highest-ever sum of money paid by a club to purchase the contract, and thereby obtain the playing services of another club's player. It has been broken in every decade since the sport became professional around the start of the 20th century. Between the 1930s and 1980s, international transfer bans were imposed, removed and renewed at different times due to the sport's governing bodies' fears of excessive talent drain overseas. In 1998, the sport's transfer system was changed to allow any player aged 24 or over to move between clubs at the end of their contract without a fee being paid. As a result, transfer fees in rugby league became much more uncommon.

Record progression

Notes

References

Transfer record
Transfer